The 1913 Volta a Catalunya was the third edition of the Volta a Catalunya cycle race and was held from 6 September to 8 September 1913. The race started and finished in Barcelona. The race was won by Juan Martí.

Route and stages

General classification

References

1913
Volta
1913 in Spanish road cycling
September 1913 sports events